Thomas Henry Anthony (born 16 August 1943) is an English retired professional football left back who played in the Football League for Brentford.

Career

Brentford 
A graduate of the Brentford youth team, an injury crisis saw Anthony make his professional debut in a Fourth Division match versus Stockport County on 18 September 1962. He went on to win a regular place in the team and made 35 appearances over the course of the 1962–63 season, which also saw him win a Fourth Division winners' medal. After losing his place to new signing Allan Jones, Anthony managed just one appearance during the 1963–64 season and failed to appear at all during the following campaign. He instead played for the reserves and captained the team to the 1964–65 London Challenge Cup. Anthony departed the Bees at the end of the 1964–65 season, after making 36 appearances and scoring one goal for the club.

Guildford City 
Anthony had trials at Football League clubs Coventry City and Millwall, but failed to win a contract at either club. He dropped into non-league football in 1966 and enjoyed a five-year spell at Southern League club Guildford City, with whom he won the First Division championship in the 1970–71 season. Anthony made over 200 appearances for the club.

Honours 
Brentford
Football League Fourth Division: 1962–63
 London Challenge Cup: 1964–65
Guildford City
 Southern League First Division: 1970–71

Career statistics

References

1943 births
Living people
Footballers from Hounslow
English footballers
Brentford F.C. players
English Football League players
Guildford City F.C. players
Association football fullbacks
Southern Football League players